The 2010 Daily Mirror Grand Slam of Darts was the fourth staging of the darts tournament, the Grand Slam of Darts organised by the Professional Darts Corporation. The event took place from 13–21 November 2010 at the Wolverhampton Civic Hall, Wolverhampton, England. Television coverage of the tournament was covered by ITV Sport, with live coverage on ITV4. It would prove to be the final time a Grand Slam tournament would be broadcast on ITV Sport, as Sky Sports took over broadcasting rights the following year.

Although 8–0 down at one stage, Scott Waites made a remarkable comeback to defeat James Wade 16–12 in the final, becoming the first and only member of the British Darts Organisation to win this event.

Prize money

Qualifying
There were numerous tournaments that provided qualifying opportunities to players. Most tournaments offering a qualifying position for the winner and runner-up of the tournament, however the World Championships and the Grand Slams offers a place in the tournament to all semi-finalists. There were also various other ways of qualifying for overseas players, including those from Europe and the United States, as well as a wildcard qualifying event open to any darts player.

Qualifying tournaments

PDC

BDO

The PDC decided to no longer invite Martin Adams to the Grand Slam due to his decision to turn down three consecutive invitations in 2007, 2008 and 2009.

Other Qualifiers

Draw

Group stages
all matches first-to-5/best of 9.NB in Brackets: Number = Seeds; BDO = BDO Darts player; RQ = Ranking qualifier; Q = QualifierNB: P = Played; W = Won; L = Lost; LF = Legs for; LA = Legs against; +/- = Plus/minus record, in relation to legs; Average = 3-dart average; Pts = Points

Group A

13 November

14 November

16 November

Group B

13 November

14 November

16 November

Group C

13 November

14 November

16 November

Group D

13 November

14 November

16 November

Group E

14 November

15 November

17 November

Group F

14 November

15 November

17 November

Group G

14 November

15 November

17 November

Group H

14 November

15 November

17 November

Knockout stages

Statistics

References

External links
Netzone, with results and news
ITV's coverage of the event

Grand Slam
2010
Grand Slam of Darts
Grand Slam of Darts